Alberto Ablondi (18 December 1924 – 21 August 2010) was the Catholic bishop of the Diocese of Livorno, Italy.

Biography
Born in Milan, Italy, Ablondi was ordained to the priesthood on 31 May 1947. On 9 August 1966, Ablondi was appointed auxiliary bishop of the Livorno Diocese and was ordained on 1 October 1966. On 7 September 1970, he was appointed coadjutor bishop of the diocese succeeding on 26 September 1970. He retired on 9 December 2000.

See also

References

1924 births
2010 deaths
20th-century Italian Roman Catholic bishops
Clergy from Milan